Brigid Lenihan (1929–1970) was a New Zealand actor who worked extensively in Australia on stage and screen.

She died in her sleep aged 41.

Select TV Credits
The Face of Love (1954)
The Little Woman (1961)
A Night Out (1961)
Lola Montez (1962)
Red Peppers (1962)
The Taming of the Shrew (1962)
My Three Angels (1962)
Jonah (1962)
The Right Thing (1963)
The Hungry Ones (1963)
The Mavis Bramston Show (1965)
Goodbye, Gloria, Hello! (1967)

Select Theatre
Six Characters in Search of an Author (1949)
Boeing Boeing (1964)
A Cat Among the Pigeons (1970)

References

External links
Brigid Lenihan at IMDb

New Zealand actresses
1929 births
1970 deaths